Dichomeris xuthochyta is a moth in the family Gelechiidae. It was described by Turner in 1919. It is found in Australia, where it has been recorded from Queensland.

The forewings are fuscous with the discal dots very obscurely darker, the plical beyond the first discal. The hindwings are fuscous with a large tornal ochreous blotch extending from mid-dorsum to mid-termen.

References

Moths described in 1919
xuthochyta